Americanus, a Latin adjective meaning American, may refer to:

 Carl Linnaeus#Four races
 A pen name used by Benjamin Franklin
 "Junius Americanus", a pen name used by Arthur Lee (1740–1792), American diplomat and author
 Draco americanus, a legendary dragon species

See also
 Americana (disambiguation), a Latin adjective with the same meaning
 Americanum
 Americano (disambiguation)
 Americain (disambiguation)
 American (disambiguation)
 Junius Americanus